Mean kinetic temperature (MKT) is a simplified way of expressing the overall effect of temperature fluctuations during storage or transit of perishable goods. The MKT is widely used in the pharmaceutical industry.

The mean kinetic temperature can be expressed as:

Where:

  is the mean kinetic temperature in kelvins
  is the activation energy (in kJ mol−1)
  is the gas constant (in J mol−1 K−1)

When the temperature readings are taken at the same interval (i.e.,  =  =  = ), the above equation is reduced to:

Where:
  is the number of temperature sample points

Temperature
Pharmaceutical industry